Stainz is a municipality in the district of Deutschlandsberg in the Austrian state of Styria. A notable building there is Schloss Stainz, a former monastery complex that belongs to the Counts of Meran and hosts collections from the Universalmuseum Joanneum.

Population

References

Cities and towns in Deutschlandsberg District